Enypia venata, the variable girdle, is a species of geometrid moth in the family Geometridae. It was first described by Augustus Radcliffe Grote in 1883 and it is found in North America.

The MONA or Hodges number for Enypia venata is 7005.

References

Further reading

External links

 

Ourapterygini
Articles created by Qbugbot
Moths described in 1883